Force of Nature: The David Suzuki Movie is a Canadian documentary film, directed by Sturla Gunnarsson and released in 2010. The film profiles Canadian science broadcaster and environmental activist David Suzuki.

The film premiered at the 2010 Toronto International Film Festival, where it won the People's Choice Award for Documentaries. At the Cinéfest Sudbury International Film Festival, it won the award for Best Documentary.

References

External links
 

2010 films
2010 documentary films
Canadian documentary films
Films directed by Sturla Gunnarsson
National Film Board of Canada documentaries
2010s English-language films
2010s Canadian films